The following is a list of coaches to have coached the Brisbane Lions, an Australian rules football club which fields teams in the AFL (1997–present) and AFL Women's (2017–present).

AFL coaches

AFL Women's coaches

Key: 
 P = Played
 W = Won
 L = Lost
 D = Drew
 W% = Win percentage (rounded to two decimal places)

See also

List of Brisbane Bears coaches

List of Fitzroy Football Club coaches

References

External links
AFL Tables - Brisbane Lions - Coaches

Brisbane Lions coaches
Lions